Anatole is a French male name, derived from the Greek name Ανατολιος Anatolius, meaning "sunrise." The Russian version of the name is Anatoly (also transliterated as Anatoliy and Anatoli). Other variants are Anatol and more rarely Anatolio.

 Anatole, baron Brénier de Renaudière (1807–1885), French diplomat and politician
 Anatole Abragam (1914–2011), French physicist who wrote The Principles of Nuclear Magnetism
 Anatole Broyard (1920–1990), American literary critic for The New York Times
 Anatole (dancer), French ballet dancer, master and composer
 Anatole Dauman (1925–1998), French film producer
 Anatole Deibler (1863-1939), Monsieur de Paris, 1899-1939
 Anatole de Grunwald (1910–1967), British film producer and screenwriter
 Anatole de Monzie (1876–1947), French administrator and encyclopaedist
 Anatole Fistoulari (1907–1995), Ukrainian conductor
 Anatole France (1844–1924), French poet, journalist and novelist
 Anatole Jakovsky (1909–1988), French art critic
 Anatole Kanyenkiko (born 1952), Prime Minister of Burundi from 1994 to 1995
 Anatole Katok (1944–2018), American mathematician
 Anatole Le Braz (1859–1926), Breton folklore collector and translator
 Anatole Litvak (1902–1974), Ukrainian-born filmmaker
 Anatole Mallet (1837–1919), Swiss mechanical engineer
 Anatole Taubman (born 1971), Swiss actor
 Anatole Vakhnianyn (1841–1908), Ukrainian political and cultural figure
 Anatole Serret, Australian percussionist for Parcels

See also
 Anatoly (name)

Given names of Greek language origin
French masculine given names